Framlingham Gawdy (8 August 1589 – 1654) was an English politician who sat in the House of Commons  from 1614 to 1648. He was a passive Parliamentarian during the English Civil War.

Gawdy was the son of Sir Bassingbourne Gawdy of West Harling, Norfolk and his wife Anne Framlingham, daughter of Sir Charles Framlingham of Crow's Hall, Debenham, Suffolk. He was High Sheriff of Norfolk in 1627.

In April 1640, Gawdy was elected Member of Parliament for Thetford in the Short Parliament. He was re-elected in November 1640 as MP for Thetford in the Long Parliament and held the seat until 1648 when he was excluded under Pride's Purge. 
 
Gawdy died at the age of 65. Gawdy had married Lettice Knollys, daughter of Sir Robert Knollys and Catherine Vaughan, and had eight children. His son William Gawdy was also MP for Thetford and was created a baronet and his grandson Sir John Gawdy, 2nd Baronet, who was deaf and mute was a celebrated painter.

References

External links
The Gawdy Papers (1509-c. 1750) and the history of professional writing in England
GAWDY, Framlingham (1589-1655), of Bardwell Hall, West Harling, Norf.; History of Parliament Online

1589 births
1654 deaths
People from Harling, Norfolk
High Sheriffs of Norfolk
Roundheads
English MPs 1614
English MPs 1621–1622
English MPs 1624–1625
English MPs 1625
English MPs 1626
English MPs 1640 (April)
English MPs 1640–1648
Members of the Parliament of England for Thetford